Kriegsakademie (German for war academy) may refer to:

 War Academy (Kingdom of Bavaria) of the Royal Bavarian Army, located in Munich (1867–1914)
 Prussian Military Academy of the Royal Prussian Army, located in Berlin

See also 
 military academy
 Kriegsschule, German military training school.